The Capital Governorate, sometimes referred to as Al Kuwayt, is one of the six governorates of Kuwait. It comprises the historic core of Kuwait City, industrial and port areas such as Shuwaikh and Doha Port, and several offshore islands. It consists of the following areas:

Abdullah Al-Salem عبدالله السالم
Adiliya العديلية
Bneid Al-Qar بنيد القار
Al Da'iya الدعية
Al Dasma الدسمة
Al Faiha الفيحا
Faylakah (consisting of the islands of Failaka, Miskan, and Auhah)
Jaber Al-Ahmad جابر الاحمد
Jibla
Kaifan كيفان
Khaldiya 
Al Mansouriah المنصورية
Murgab المرقاب
Al-Nuzha النزهة
Al Qadisiya القادسية
Qurtoba قرطبة
Rawdah الروضة
Al Shamiya الشامية
Sharq
Al Shuwaikh الشويخ
Sulaibikhat
Al Surra السرة
Al Yarmouk اليرموك
North West Sulaibikhat شمال غرب الصليبيخات

Al-ʿĀṣima means 'The Capital' in Arabic. Al-ʿĀṣima houses most of Kuwait's financial and business centres such as the Kuwait Stock Exchange.

Government
Mr. Nasir Sabah Nasir Mubarak I was governor from 1962 until his death in 1979. Salim Sabah Nasir Mubarak I became the next governor, circa 1979. Jabir Abdallah Jabir Abdallah II become governor in 1985. Thabit Al Muhanna became governor in 2014.

References

 
Governorates of Kuwait